Dafydd Wynne Wigley, Baron Wigley,  (born David Wigley; 1 April 1943) is a Welsh politician. He served as Plaid Cymru Member of Parliament (MP) for Caernarfon from 1974 until 2001 and as Assembly Member for Caernarfon from 1999 until 2003. He was the leader of Plaid Cymru from 1981 to 1984 and again from 1991 to 2000. On 19 November 2010, it was announced that he had been granted a life peerage by the Queen, and he took his seat in the House of Lords, as Baron Wigley of Caernarfon, on 24 January 2011.

Early life

Wigley was born in Derby, England, the only child of Welsh parents Elfyn Edward Wigley and Myfanwy Batterbee. He attended Caernarfon grammar school and Rydal School before going on to the Victoria University of Manchester and training as an accountant. He was employed by Hoover as a financial controller before entering parliament.

Political career
In May 1972 Wigley became a councillor on the pre-1974 Merthyr Tydfil County Borough Council, winning in the Park, Merthyr Tydfil ward, with the sitting Labour councillor in third place.

UK Parliament

After coming second at Merioneth in the 1970 General Election, in 1974 Wigley became one of Plaid Cymru's first three MPs to be elected to the UK Parliament. He beat Dafydd Elis Thomas to be elected party president (leader) in 1981 following the retirement of Gwynfor Evans, who had led Plaid Cymru since 1945.

The election for president was seen as instrumental in deciding the future direction of Plaid Cymru. Wigley represented a moderate, pragmatic social democracy, in sharp contrast with rival candidate Dafydd Elis Thomas's socialism. In 1981 Wigley won the presidency, but Elis Thomas had greater influence over the party's ideology throughout the 1980s. In 1984 Wigley resigned from the presidency because of his children's health, but he returned in 1991 for a second term after the resignation of Elis Thomas. Wigley led Plaid until 2000. He stood down as an MP at the 2001 General Election to concentrate on his role in the Assembly.

National Assembly for Wales

In the 1999 National Assembly for Wales election Wigley became a member of the National Assembly for Wales, and led the Plaid Cymru opposition to Labour, before his resignation from the leadership, officially on medical advice but amid rumours of an internal plot against him in 2000. and in 2003 as an AM.

In 2006 he sought and secured nomination to Plaid Cymru's North Wales party list as the secondary candidate for the 2007 National Assembly for Wales election but because in part of constituency seat gains, Plaid Cymru failed to gain a second regional seat.

House of Lords

He secured a Plaid Cymru nomination for a peerage alongside Eurfyl ap Gwilym and Janet Davies. He initially withdrew his candidature after complaining about how long the process was taking but eventually received a peerage.

On 19 November 2010 it was announced that he had been granted a life peerage by the Queen, and he took his seat in the House of Lords as Baron Wigley, of Caernarfon in the County of Gwynedd on 24 January 2011, supported by fellow Plaid peer Lord Elis-Thomas and by Lord Faulkner of Worcester. He made his maiden speech on 27 January during a debate on tourism. Having been one of the first MPs to take the House of Commons oath of allegiance in the Welsh language in 1974, he took the oath of allegiance in Welsh on entering the Lords.

Personal life

He married the Welsh harpist Elinor Bennett. The couple had four children, son Hywel Wigley and daughter Eluned Wigley as well as two sons, Alun and Geraint, who died of a genetic illness. His sons' condition influenced the direction of his career, and he took a strong interest in the affairs of disabled people, being vice-chairman of the Parliamentary all-party disablement group, vice-president of Disability Wales, vice-president of Mencap (Wales), former president of the Spastics' Society of Wales and sponsor of the Disabled Persons Act in 1981. In 2003 Wigley became Pro-Chancellor of the University of Wales.

Awards
In 2008, Wigley was awarded an Honorary Chair in Business at Bangor University.

References

External links

UK Parliament Profile

The Right Honourable Dafydd Wigley – University of Wales
BBC News CV on Dafydd Wigley

1943 births
Alumni of the Victoria University of Manchester
Leaders of Plaid Cymru
Leaders of political parties in Wales
Living people
Members of Parliament for Caernarfon
Members of the Privy Council of the United Kingdom
People associated with the University of Wales
People from Derby
Plaid Cymru members of the Senedd
Plaid Cymru MPs
UK MPs 1974
UK MPs 1974–1979
UK MPs 1979–1983
UK MPs 1983–1987
UK MPs 1987–1992
UK MPs 1992–1997
UK MPs 1997–2001
Wales AMs 1999–2003
Welsh-speaking politicians
Life peers
Plaid Cymru life peers
Life peers created by Elizabeth II